The Action Front for Renewal and Development is a political party in Benin.

FARD-Alafia was founded in 1994 and supported the candidacy of Mathieu Kérékou in the 1996 presidential election. Kérékou stood as party's candidate in the presidential election of March 4 and 18 March 2001, winning 45.4% of the popular vote in the first round and 84.1% in the second round. The second round was boycotted by the main contenders.

In February 2004, Daniel Tawéma, who was then Minister of the Interior, was elected as the party's secretary general, succeeding Jerome Sacca Kina Guezere.

In the parliamentary election held on 30 March 2003, the party was member of the Presidential Movement, the alliance of Kérékou's supporters. It established inside this Movement the Union for Future Benin, that won 31 out of 83 seats. The party's candidate in the March 2006 presidential election was Daniel Tawéma, who took 0.60% of the vote.

References

1994 establishments in Benin
Democratic socialist parties in Africa
Political parties established in 1994
Political parties in Benin
Social democratic parties in Africa
Socialist parties in Benin